Pasco High School is a 9-12 public high school in Pasco, Washington. It was the only High School in Pasco until 2009 when Chiawana High School, in West Pasco, opened its doors.

In 2006, the Pasco voters approved a $90 million+ bond to construct a new high school on Argent and Road 84 to ease the overcrowding of Pasco High. The new Chiawana High School, opened its doors in the fall of 2009 along Argent Road. During the time of construction, Pasco High turned Captain Gray STEM Elementary School, located at 1102 N.10th Avenue into an annex, where a majority of freshman classes were held. Once Chiawana High opened, the building once again became Captain Gray Elementary. Additionally, the school makes use of over 50 portable classrooms.

Pasco High is one of Washington state's largest high schools; it is classified as a 4A school (the classification for the largest schools in that state) with an enrollment of more than 1,800 students.

Academics 
Due to the abundance of underprivileged families in Pasco, college is a difficult or even impossible option for some students. Pasco High School has programs to train these students in various occupational areas, though these programs have had little success over all and are generally considered an excuse not to try for college (not bad in all cases as it is often impossible). One of these is the "Bulldog House" where students help build a house in the community and sell it, with the proceeds going towards next year's house and various scholarships. The Running Start program is offered by the school with the chance for dual enrollment open for students at Columbia Basin College, WSU Tri-Cities, and technical training offered at the Tri-Tech Skill Center.

One avenue pursued to overcome prejudice and inequity in the Hispanic community has been the pursuit of academic excellence and participation in the Hispanic Academic Achievers Program (HAAP) where students and families are recognized annually for the student maintaining a 3.0 or greater GPA. Senior HAAP members also apply for substantial scholarships to college and act as role models to younger siblings making it possible for the next generation to be even more competitive in the USA.

Pasco has made Newsweek magazine's annual "Newsweek's Best American High Schools" list many times. This list includes the top 6% of schools in the nation. The schools are ranked according to the Challenge Index. “The Washington Post Challenge Index measures a public high school’s effort to challenge its students.  The formula is simple: divide the number of Advanced Placement, International Baccalaureate or Cambridge tests a school gave by the number of seniors who graduated in June.  Tests taken by all students, not just seniors, are counted.” Pasco High School placed during the following years:

2004 - Placed 876th

2005 - Placed 905th

2007 - Placed 913th

2009 - Placed 853rd

Source: Pasco School District Website

Athletics 
Pasco High School's mascots are the Bulldogs. They having a strong rivalry with the Chiawana High Riverhawks. The rivalry started in early 2010 and since then, the Bulldogs have never won any of the 13 football games played against the Riverhawks.

Pasco High School has won 7 state championships and have placed second in state championships 10 times, meaning they have made it to the final state championship games 17 times.

The football team won the state championship in 1998, 2000, and 2003, and followed it up with a conference championship the following year. The Bulldogs were ranked 27th in the nation and had a twenty-seven game win streak during this period before losing in 2001 in the state championship versus cross-state rival Kentwood High School. Football in Pasco has been a sport of unity in the community. Games at Edgar Brown Memorial Stadium are viewed as social and community building events.

The Pasco High School Boys Soccer Team has also been extremely successful, having won two state championships in 1999 and 2007. The team has been ranked as high as third in the nation (1999) and fourth in 2007. They have made the playoffs for 14 straight years. In 2009 they were set to be first in the nation but lost the State Championship game 1-2 and dropped to 15th in the nation.

Boys Basketball won a state title in 1947.

The dance team's Hip Hop squad has been District Champions for every year since the team was started. That is 11 years in a row. Also the team has placed third in state for Hip Hop for 6 years straight. In 2011 the Show team were WIAA 3A state Champions. They were also 2014 state champions in both Hip Hop and Show beating the defending hip hop state champions, Todd Beamer High School.

When fundraising for the Field of Pride for Edgar Brown Memorial Stadium, Nike released a limited edition version of their Air brand shoes, called Nike Air Pasco.

Performing arts 
The Marching Band at Pasco continues to be one of the best in Washington State. In 2006 they won sweepstakes in both Everett and Yakima. In 2007 they won sweepstakes along with every single caption award in their division in Yakima, and they won first in their division (third overall) in Spokane and first in their Division (second overall) in Wenatchee. Most recently in 2008, they received second in their division (third overall) at Spokane and fourth overall in Everett. The marching band considers themselves to have only two rivals, both being from the Spokane area; they are Central Valley and Mead.

The Jazz and concert bands continue to win superior ratings in their competitions with a few people going to state as part of solo and ensemble. And more recently they beat Mead High School at the CBC jazz unlimited festival taking first place and took second place at the Bellevue Jazz Festival in April 2009.

Other activities include the 10th Avenue Singers who, under the direction of Mel Haug, recently took first place at the CBC Jazz Festival. 10th Avenue has put on yearly shows since Haug came to the school. These shows have included A Radio Show, Beach Party, The U.S.O. Show, A Tribute to Motown, 10th Avenue Idol (a spin-off of the popular American Idol), The British Invasion, and most recently, A Tribute to American Bandstand. The group has also toured in Hawaii several times over the years. They have become moderately famous throughout Pasco and the wider Tri-cities.

The drama department recently went to Scotland to participate in the American High School Theatre Festival, which showcases the top high school theater productions in the United States.

Notable alumni 
Jeremy Bonderman, Detroit Tigers Pitcher, the only player ever drafted as a junior in high school.
Tyler Brayton - Carolina Panthers Defensive End
Anthony Davis - Kansas City Chiefs Linebacker
Michael Jackson - Linebacker
Keith A. Moore - nerdcore Artist
Karen Murray-Hodgins - Basketball
Ron Howard - Football
Bruce Kison - Baseball
Duke Washington - Football
Richard "Doc" Hastings - United States Congressman
Joseph Santos - American Painter/Artist
Kathy Brock - News Presenter at WLS-TV
Raul Vijil - former Arena Football League Wide Receiver
Roy Williams -  NFL Player

References

External links 
 

High schools in Franklin County, Washington
Pasco, Washington
Public high schools in Washington (state)